The Deschutes River in central Oregon is a major tributary of the Columbia River. The river provides much of the drainage on the eastern side of the Cascade Range in Oregon, gathering many of the tributaries that descend from the drier, eastern flank of the mountains. The Deschutes provided an important route to and from the Columbia for Native Americans for thousands of years, and then in the 19th century for pioneers on the Oregon Trail. The river flows mostly through rugged and arid country, and its valley provides a cultural heart for central Oregon. Today the river supplies water for irrigation and is popular in the summer for whitewater rafting and fishing.

The river flows generally north, as do several other large Oregon tributaries of the Columbia River, including the Willamette and John Day.

Course

In central Bend, the river enters Mirror Pond, an impoundment behind Newport hydroelectric dam. The pond extends upstream to the Galveston Bridge and is a feature of Drake Park as well as Harmon, Pageant, and Brooks parks. From April through October, diversions to Central Oregon Irrigation District canals reduce the river flow between Bend and Pelton Reregulating Dam, at river mile (RM) 100; that is, river kilometer (RK) 160.

The river continues north from Bend, and just west of Redmond, Oregon. Here it passes by Eagle Crest Resort and Cline Falls State Scenic Viewpoint. As it heads north through the central Oregon high desert, the river carves a gorge bordered by large basalt cliffs. At Lake Billy Chinook the river is joined by the Crooked and Metolius rivers.

Beyond the dam, the river continues north in a gorge well below the surrounding countryside. It passes through the Warm Springs Indian Reservation, which includes the city of Warm Springs and the Kah-Nee-Ta resort.

Tributaries
Named tributaries of the Deschutes River from source to mouth include Snow Creek then the Cultus River, Cultus Creek and Deer Creek, which enter at Crane Prairie Reservoir. Further downstream come the Fall River, the Little Deschutes River, and the Spring River followed by Tumalo Creek and Whychus Creek.

The Metolius River and the Crooked River are next, both entering at Lake Billy Chinook. Then come Seekseequa Creek and Willow Creek followed by Dry Hollow and Campbell, Shitike and Trout creeks, after which comes the Warm Springs River. Further downstream are Swamp, Skookum, Oak, Antoken, Cove, Eagle, Nena, Wapinitia and Bakeoven creeks. Spring Creek is next, followed by Oak Springs Creek and the White River. Below that are Winterwater and Elder creeks.

History
Prior to 80,000 years ago, the river ran along the east side of Pilot Butte and a lava flow from Lava Top Butte filled in this ancient channel. Previously, the basalt of the Bend lava flow, associated with the Lava River Cave, had diverted the river westward to its present-day location.

The river was named Rivière des Chutes or Rivière aux Chutes, French for River of the Falls, during the period of fur trading. The waterfall it referred to was the Celilo Falls on the Columbia River, near where the Deschutes flowed into it. (These falls no longer exist, having been inundated by the lake behind The Dalles Dam).

Lewis and Clark encountered the river on October 22, 1805, and referred to it by the Native American name Towarnehiooks; on their return journey they gave it the new name Clarks River. Variant names include Clarks River, River of the Falls, Riviere des Chutes, Chutes River, and Falls River.

During the middle 19th century, the river was a major obstacle for immigrants on the Oregon Trail. The major crossing point on the river was near its mouth in present-day Deschutes River State Recreation Area. Many immigrants camped on the bluff on the west side of the river after making the crossing. The remains of the trail leading up to the top of the bluff are still visible.

In 1910, Mirror Pond was created by the construction of the Bend Water, Light & Power Company dam on the river in Bend.  The dam provided the city with its initial source of electricity. The dam has been owned by Pacific Power since 1930 and still produces electricity that supplies approximately 400 Bend households.

In 1908, two competing railroad companies, the Deschutes Railroad and the Oregon Trunk Railway, raced to build a line from the mouth of the river to Bend. The Deschutes Railroad, a Union Pacific subsidiary, was owned by Edward H. Harriman and the Oregon Trunk was owned by James J. Hill.

In 1964, on the Deschutes River, Portland General Electric (PGE) built, what was at the time, the largest hydroelectric dam in Oregon.

Fishing

The river is world-renowned for its fly fishing. It is home to Columbia River redband trout (Oncorhynchus mykiss gairdneri) known locally as "redsides". The redsides grow larger than most and also have a distinct darker red stripe than most wild rainbow trout. They are abundant in this stretch of the river, which has counts of 1,700 fish of 7 inches in size per mile (1,100 fish of 18 centimeters in size per kilometer) above Sherar's Falls, and they are noticeably stronger than trout who do not have to cope with life in such a big, powerful river. These redside or redband trouts are found throughout the river. Fishing from Tribal lands requires special permits. From Pelton Dam to the mouth the Deschutes is one of America's most productive trout waters and a top producer of summer steelhead, managed primarily for wild trout.

Fly fishermen come from around the world in the last two weeks in May through the first two weeks in June to take advantage of the hatching stoneflies, both salmonflies and golden stoneflies (Hesperoperla pacifica). These insects are in the river year-round; however their large adults are a major food source for the fish: artificial weighted stonefly nymph patterned tied flies are a staple for Deschutes anglers year round.

Sport fishing for Steelhead occurs in the river from the mouth to Round Butte Dam. Sport fishing for spring and fall Chinook salmon occurs from the mouth to Sherars Falls. Tribal fishing for Chinook and steelhead occurs at Sherars Falls.

Crane Prairie Reservoir, the first major lake/reservoir the Deschutes flows into, offers some of the best rainbow trout fishing in Oregon, with a large number of rainbows in the 4-10 pound range and some reaching 20 pounds. These trout are renowned for their size and are given the nickname "cranebows". Other fish found in Crane Prairie are brook trout, kokanee salmon, largemouth bass, black crappie, tui chub, three-spined stickleback, and whitefish.  Fly, lure, and bait fishing are popular methods, with the majority of trout fisherman casting or trolling in the channels. For the best chance of catching large fish, a boat or other flotation device is recommended as the channels can be wide and deep.

Located roughly seven miles southeast of Crane Prairie Reservoir, you will find Wickiup Reservoir. Wickiup Reservoir holds a wide variety of species open to angling. Wickiup holds a reputable amount of both kokanee and Coho salmon. It is not uncommon to catch rainbow trout, brook trout, whitefish and chub. However, most anglers whether they know it or not, are targeting large brown trout. Wickiup Reservoir holds many brown trout in the five to eight pound range, and has also been known to produce brown trout in the mid-twenty pound range. This reservoir is most easily fished from a boat due to its depth. Most people find success in trolling lures horizontally through the depths of the reservoir. Vertical jigging in an aggressive manner can be an effective method of targeting the salmon species of the reservoir. Bank fishing offers dry fly-fishing enthusiasts an opportunity to catch fish hiding under the obstructions of the shallows.

In Lake Billy Chinook, there are fisheries for kokanee, bull trout, rainbow trout, brown trout, and several warm-water species such as large mouth bass and a very large population of small mouth bass. There are also periodic commercial fisheries for crayfish. The bull trout that are caught in this reservoir are some of the largest bull trout caught on the west coast. The numbers are scarce because the bulls are threatened; however, numbers have risen every year since they became protected. (This is included for a daily bag limit.)

River use
Much of the flow of the upper Deschutes River is diverted into canals to irrigate farmland; irrigation districts take nearly 98% of the river's flow in the summer months. The growth of cities like Bend and Redmond also increased demand on the river's water, which is over-allocated. Because the existing canals lose about half of their water due to seepage, there is pressure to convert these canals into pipelines, a move that is resisted by many locals for historic and aesthetic reasons. Golf courses have also been an issue with water allocation. There are 13 golf courses throughout Bend, Redmond, and Sunriver.

There are primarily two sections of the river popular for whitewater rafting and kayaking. The upstream section known as the Big Eddy is a short segment upriver from the city of Bend between Dillon and Lava Island falls. The lower and more heavily used section is from the town of Warm Springs downstream to just above Sherars Falls.

See also
 List of longest streams of Oregon
 List of National Wild and Scenic Rivers
 List of rivers of Oregon

References

External links
 
 Deschutes River flows and forecasts
 Upper Deschutes Watershed Council
 National Wild and Scenic Rivers System

Rivers of Oregon
Columbia River Gorge
Rivers of Jefferson County, Oregon
Rivers of Wasco County, Oregon
Wild and Scenic Rivers of the United States
Tributaries of the Columbia River
Rivers of Deschutes County, Oregon